Mooball is a locality in the Tweed Shire, New South Wales, Australia.

History 
The name of the town is from the Bandjalung-Yugambeh dialect chain word 'mobool', the cane of a lawyer vine. 

In March 2012, Mooball was declared free of plastic bags.

In 2016, an unusually high number of cancer cases in residents of Mooball raised concerns about whether there were radioactive elements introduced through a local sand mining business.

Thanks to its rural setting, Mooball is a popular tourist destination, whose attraction includes black-and-white cow style markings.

References

Northern Rivers
Tweed Shire